The 1911 Brown Bears football team represented Brown University as an independent during the 1911 college football season. Led by tenth-year head coach Edward N. Robinson, Brown compiled a record of 7–3–1.

Schedule

References

Brown
Brown Bears football seasons
Brown Bears football